Nova Sport 1 is focused primarily on mainstream sports and broadcasts sporting events and sport-related programming in the Czech Republic and Slovakia. It has broadcasting licenses for major sport leagues and events including the National Hockey League (NHL), ATP 250 Tennis tournaments, and Moto GP. Nova Sport also produces various weekly sports shows and magazines, as well as locally produced daily sports news programs in the Czech Republic and Slovakia.

Nova Sport 2 focuses on popular sports that have not yet been broadcast to a similar extent, including the National Basketball Association (NBA), darts tournaments, Bellator MMA and also international rugby.

Sport competitions

Football 
FIFA Club World Cup
UEFA Champions League
Copa Libertadores
EFL Cup
FA Cup
Major League Soccer
La Liga
La Liga 2
Serie A
Coupe de France
Ligue 1
Ligue 2
Bundesliga
2. Bundesliga
DFB-Pokal
Fortuna Liga
Fortuna Liga Slovensko

Tennis 
ATP Tour 250

Basketball 
NBA

Handball 
Handball-Bundesliga

Rugby 
Premiership Rugby
Women's Six Nations

Ice hockey 
NHL

Floorball 
Swedish Super League

Motorsport 
Moto2
Moto3
MotoGP
NASCAR Cup Series
NASCAR Truck Series

Kickboxing 
WBC

Mixed Martial Arts 
Bellator MMA
KSW

Darts 
Premier League Darts

Pool 
World Pool Masters

Equestrianism 
Longines Global Champions Tour

References

Television stations in the Czech Republic
Sports television networks
Central European Media Enterprises
Television channels and stations established in 2002
Czech-language television stations
2002 establishments in the Czech Republic
TV Nova (Czech Republic)